World Series of Fighting 22: Palhares vs. Shields was a mixed martial arts event held  in Las Vegas, Nevada, United States. This event aired on NBCSN in the U.S and on Fight Network in Canada.

Background
The event went head-to-head with UFC 190 on the same night.

The main event was scheduled to be a fight for the WSOF Welterweight Championship between champion Rousimar Palhares making his second defence of his title against challenger Jake Shields.

The co-main event was scheduled to be a fight for the WSOF Bantamweight Championship between champion Marlon Moraes making his second defence of his title against challenger Sheymon Moraes.

Tyrone Spong was expected to face Mike Kyle at the event. However, Spong pulled out of the bout due to an injury and was replaced by Thiago Silva. In turn, Silva was forced out of the bout after being deemed ineligible to receive a license by the Nevada State Athletic Commission. Short notice replacement Clifford Starks stepped in to face Kyle at the event.

Results

Guest live appearances
For the closing of the Preliminary Card Livestream, a guest set was performed by Venezuelan eOne Music artist DJ Zardonic including a performance of "Bring It On", a track that served as the WSOF theme song in 2015.

See also 
 World Series of Fighting
 List of WSOF champions
 List of WSOF events

References

World Series of Fighting events
2015 in mixed martial arts
Zappos Theater